Carry On is the second compilation from American rock band Kansas, released in 1992 (see 1992 in music).  It was later repackaged and re-released in 2005 as On the Other Side (see below); also, "Play the Game Tonight" and "Don't Take Your Love Away" were replaced with "What's on My Mind" and "Child of Innocence."

Track listing
All songs written by Kerry Livgren, except where noted.

 "Carry On Wayward Son" – 5:23
 "What's on My Mind" – 3:28
 "The Wall" (Livgren, Steve Walsh) – 4:47
 "Dust in the Wind" – 3:25
 "Can I Tell You" (Phil Ehart, Dave Hope, Walsh, Rich Williams) – 3:33
 "People of the South Wind" – 3:38
 "It Takes a Woman's Love (To Make a Man)" (Walsh) – 3:06
 "Child of Innocence" – 4:35
 "Two Cents Worth" (Livgren, Walsh) – 3:08
 "On the Other Side" – 6:22

Personnel
Phil Ehart - drums
Dave Hope - bass
Kerry Livgren - guitar, keyboards
Robby Steinhardt - violin, vocals, anvil
Steve Walsh - keyboards, vocals
Rich Williams - guitar

2005 greatest hits albums
Kansas (band) compilation albums
Bertelsmann Music Group compilation albums